Nawabzada Muhammad Akbar Khan Hoti (born; 8 February 1956), is a Pakistani police officer who served as Inspector General of Khyber Pakhtunkhwa Police (25 October 2011 to 16 April 2013) and Director General of FIA (25 November 2014 to February 2016).

References 

1956 births
Living people
IGPs of Khyber Pakhtunkhwa Police
Pakistani police officers
People from Mardan District
Directors General of the Federal Investigation Agency